2016–17 Albanian Cup was the sixty-fifth season of Albania's annual cup competition. Tirana won the title for the 16th time, becoming the most successful club in cup's history.

Ties are played in a two-legged format similar to those of European competitions. If the aggregate score is tied after both games, the team with the higher number of away goals advances. If the number of away goals is equal in both games, the match is decided by extra time and a penalty shoot-out, if necessary.

Preliminary round
In order to reduce the number of participating teams for the First Round to 32, a preliminary tournament is played. In contrast to the main tournament, the preliminary tournament is held as a single-leg knock-out competition. Matches were played on 25 September 2016 and involved the teams from Albanian Second Division.

|-

|}

First round
All 28 teams of the 2016–17 Superliga and First Division entered in this round along with the two qualifiers from the Preliminary Round. The first legs were played on 28 September 2016 and the second legs took place on 5 October 2016.

|}

Second round
All 16 qualified teams from First Round progressed to the Second Round. The first legs were played on 26 October 2016 and the second legs took place on 16 November 2016.

|}

Quarter-finals
All eight qualified teams from the second round progressed to the quarter-finals. The first legs were played on 1 February 2017 and the second legs took place on 15 February 2017.

|}

Semi-finals
The first legs were played on 5–6 April and the second legs were played on 19 April 2017.

|}

Final

References

External links
 Official website 
 Albanian Cup at soccerway.com

Cup
Albanian Cup seasons
Albanian Cup